DeLuxe Color or Deluxe color or Color by DeLuxe is Deluxe Laboratories brand of color process for motion pictures. DeLuxe Color is Eastmancolor-based, with certain adaptations for improved compositing for printing (similar to Technicolor's "selective printing") and for mass-production of prints. Eastmancolor, first introduced in 1950, was one of the first widely-successful "single strip color" processes, and eventually displaced three-strip Technicolor.

DeLuxe also offers "Showprints" (usually supplied to premieres in Los Angeles and New York). "Showprint" is DeLuxe's proprietary name for an "EK" (for "Eastman Kodak"), the generic name for a release print made directly from the original camera negative instead of from an internegative.

See also
 Alan E. Freedman
 Deluxe Entertainment Services Group
 List of color film systems
 Metrocolor
 Sol M. Wurtzel

References

External links
 Deluxe official website

Film and video technology
Technology companies established in 1915
20th Century Studios
Universal Pictures
1915 establishments in New Jersey
Companies based in Burbank, California